Xinglongdajie station, formerly known as Suojie station during planning until 2007, is a station of Line 2 of the Nanjing Metro. It started operations on 28 May 2010 along with the rest of Line 2. The theme of this station's decorations is National Day.

References

Railway stations in Jiangsu
Railway stations in China opened in 2010
Nanjing Metro stations